Alexander Gordon (Sandy) Winton (born 18 December 1970) is an Australian actor. From 2010 to 2012, he portrayed Michael Williams in the soap opera Neighbours.

Career
Winton attended Newington College (1983–1988) and graduated from Australia's National Institute of Dramatic Art (NIDA) with a degree in Performing Arts (Acting) in 1995. In March 2010, it was announced that Winton would be joining the cast of Neighbours as Michael Williams. On 7 November 2011, it was announced Winton would be leaving Neighbours in 2012. Of Winton's departure, executive producer Susan Bower said "The Michael Williams character will be leaving Ramsay Street as part of a significant story coming up in April. Sandy's contribution to the show has been superb, enabling the character to be part of some milestone storylines."

Personal life

Winton is married to Tessa Winton with two children named Harrison (Harry) Gordon Winton and Amelie (Millie) Rose Winton. Upon landing the role of Michael Williams, Winton relocated to Melbourne from Sydney. He is a supporter of AFL team, Sydney Swans.

Filmography

Film

Television

References

External links
 

1970 births
Australian male soap opera actors
Australian male film actors
Living people
People educated at Newington College